Phiambolia is a genus of flowering plants belonging to the family Aizoaceae.

Its native range is South Africa.

Species
Species:

Phiambolia francisci 
Phiambolia gydouwensis 
Phiambolia hallii 
Phiambolia incumbens 
Phiambolia littlewoodii 
Phiambolia longifolia 
Phiambolia mentiens 
Phiambolia persistens 
Phiambolia similis 
Phiambolia stayneri 
Phiambolia unca

References

Aizoaceae
Aizoaceae genera